Michael O'Higgins (1917–2005), Irish Fine Gael politician
Michael O'Higgins (economist), Irish economist
Michéal Ó hUiginn (born 1942), Irish Fianna Fáil politician 
Mícheál O’Higgins, Irish judge

See also
Michael Higgins (disambiguation)